Psychrobacter fulvigenes is a Gram-negative, oxidase- and catalase-positive, aerobic, non-spore-forming, nonmotile bacterium of the genus Psychrobacter, which was isolated from the Sea of Japan.

References

External links
Type strain of Psychrobacter fulvigenes at BacDive -  the Bacterial Diversity Metadatabase
 	

Moraxellaceae
Bacteria described in 2009